Aage Leidersdorff (10 April 1910 – 19 February 1970) was a Danish fencer. He competed at the 1932, 1936 and 1948 Summer Olympics. Leidersdorff, a Jewish sportsman, received the B.T. Gold medal in 1945 as Danish sportsperson of the year.

References

1910 births
1970 deaths
Danish male fencers
Olympic fencers of Denmark
Fencers at the 1932 Summer Olympics
Fencers at the 1936 Summer Olympics
Fencers at the 1948 Summer Olympics
Sportspeople from Copenhagen
Jewish Danish sportspeople